Pierre Dwomoh (born 21 June 2004) is a Belgian footballer who plays as a midfielder for Oostende on loan from Antwerp.

Club career
Dwomoh made his professional debut with Genk in a 2-0 Belgian First Division A win over Kortrijk.

On 27 August 2021, he signed a five-year contract with Antwerp.

On 2 September 2022, Dwomoh joined Portuguese club Braga on loan for the 2022–23 season however was recalled in December 2022 having failed to make an appearance. On 2 January 2023, he signed a new contract with Antwerp and joined Oostende on loan until the end of the season with an option to buy.

International career
Born in Belgium, Dwomoh is of Ghanaian descent. Dwomoh has played internationally for Belgium at under-15 and under-17 levels.

Career statistics

Club 

 As of match played 30 July 2021

References

External links
 
 
 ACFF Profile

2004 births
Footballers from Ghent
Living people
Belgian footballers
Belgium youth international footballers
Black Belgian sportspeople
Belgian people of Ghanaian descent
Association football midfielders
K.R.C. Genk players
Royal Antwerp F.C. players
S.C. Braga players
S.C. Braga B players
K.V. Oostende players
Belgian Pro League players
Belgian expatriate footballers
Expatriate footballers in Portugal
Belgian expatriate sportspeople in Portugal